is a DVD compilation containing promotional videos of Tanpopo songs, including close-up versions and TV commercials as well. It was released on June 16, 2004 on the Zetima label.

Track listing 
 
 "Motto"

External links 
  entry at Hello! Project official website

Tanpopo albums
2004 video albums
2004 compilation albums
Music video compilation albums
Zetima compilation albums
Zetima video albums